General elections were held in Zambia on 20 September 2011, electing a President and members of the National Assembly. Michael Sata of the Patriotic Front (PF) won the presidential elections, defeating incumbent Rupiah Banda of the Movement for Multi-Party Democracy (MMD), and was sworn into office on 23 September. The PF emerged as the largest party in the National Assembly, winning 60 of the 148 seats decided on election day.

Campaign
Incumbent President Rupiah Banda, of the ruling Movement for Multi-Party Democracy party, ran for his first full term as president after replacing Levy Mwanawasa, who died in August 2008.

Michael Sata was the candidate of the Patriotic Front and Hakainde Hichilema was the candidate of the United Party for National Development.

With Chinese companies investing US$2 billion by the end of 2010 in the Zambian economy, the status of Chinese business ties with Zambia, Africa's largest copper producer, grew significantly. Early in his campaign, Sata accused the Chinese mining firms of having slave-like labour conditions and ignoring safety standards and local cultural practices. He has been nicknamed "King Cobra" because of his harsh rhetoric, but he later toned down his rhetoric against the mostly Chinese foreign mining firms.

Conduct
Two days before the results were officially announced, the High Court banned three independent media outlets from publishing speculation on the result after The Post published a headline reading "Sata Heads for Victory." The same day, Banda's office also said that such reports were "rumours" as no final result had been compiled.  The delay in announcing the results was the cause of riots in Ndola and Kitwe, where youths fought with riot police while also burning vehicles and markets. Additionally, hackers attacked the Election Commission's website that night and posted false results suggesting Sata won by a landslide.

European Union electoral observers said that the election was "generally well administered," but that there was not equitable access to resources, resulting in the lack of a "level playing field" in the campaign. They said that state-owned media had failed to meet "even their minimal obligations as public service media."

The Zambian-based Foundation for Democratic Process criticised the holding of the election without electoral reform. It blamed the history of electoral violence and the previous failure of the losing parties to accept losing on the lack of reform. While many called for the establishment of a 50% + 1 vote system for electing the president, the government said a new system would not be used for the election.

Results
On 23 September, Chief Justice Ernest Sakala announced Sata the winner of the election with 1,150,045 votes, or 43%, with 95.3% of votes counted. Banda received 961,796 votes, or 36.1%, and other minor parties trailed in the poll. Sata was sworn into office later that day

President

National Assembly
Voting did not take place in two constituencies (Magoye and Nakonde) on polling day due to deaths of candidates, and the elected member for Chongwe (Japhen Mwakalombe of the MMD) resigned before taking his seat. By-elections were held for all three seats on 24 November 2011, with the PF winning two (Chongwe and Nakonde) and the UPND one (Magoye).

Reactions
Sata received a congratulatory telephone call from his U.S. counterpart Barack Obama. While in the 2006 election China had threatened to cut diplomatic relations with Zambia if Sata was elected, due to his criticisms of Chinese mining interests in the country, China issued a statement "welcoming" the result.

Analysis
Psephologists suggested that the youth vote helped anti-incumbency in a continent that rarely results in an anti-incumbent vote. They also drew parallels with the 2011 ousting of the presidents of Tunisia and Egypt. As a result of Sata's rhetoric, there were also concerns about the future investment climate in the country. Other readings said that after Sata toned down his rhetoric he did not differ much from Banda, but benefited from a crowded ballot of candidates. Psephologists also indicated that Sata did well in the urban areas, while Banda was expected to do well in the rural areas.

See also
List of members of the National Assembly of Zambia (2011–16)

References

External links
Election Commission of Zambia for the 2011 election

2011 in Zambia
Elections in Zambia
Zambia
Presidential elections in Zambia